Philipp Kohlschreiber defeated Mikhail Youzhny 2–6, 6–3, 6–4 to win the 2007 BMW Open singles event.

Seeds

Draw

Finals

Section 1

Section 2

External links
Association of Tennis Professionals (ATP) – 2007 Men's Singles draw
Association of Tennis Professionals (ATP) – 2007 Men's Singles Qualifying draw

Singles